Nicolás Martín Francella (born October 22, 1990) is an argentine actor, singer and television producer. He is the son of the famous actor, Guillermo Francella.

Career 
Before becoming an actor Nicolás went through different careers, as creativity in advertising, although he studied theater at night. He worked on the production of El hombre de tu vida. In 2013, he finally debuted as an actor in the Argentine film directed by Marcos Carnevale and produced by Telefe, Corazón de León. From 2013 to 2014, he was one of the protagonist of the youth television series Aliados. From 2014 to 2015, he was part of the cast of the television series Viudas e hijos del Rock and Roll. In 2015, he debuted in theater in the play Madre e hijos along with Selva Aleman and Sergio Surraco. In 2017, he makes a small participation in the television series Quiero vivir a tu lado. From 2017 to 2018, he was part of the cast of the television series Las Estrellas (telenovela). In 2019, he was part of the cast of the television series Pequeña Victoria.

Filmography

Movies

Television

Theater

Awards and nominations

References

Argentine male actors
Living people
1990 births